William Priestley (1779–1860) was a Halifax wool clothier and eminent local musician, antiquary and literary gentleman.
His strong interest in music, especially German, was manifested in his personal library, which housed many unusual items of German choral music; these formed much of the early repertoire of the Halifax Choral Society, which he is credited with founding.

References

1779 births
1860 deaths
People from Halifax, West Yorkshire
19th-century English people